Pousha Purnima,  also known as Puspuni, is an annual festival observed in Odisha, India. This is observed on the Puni (English Full Moon) day of the month of Pus (Sanskrit Pausha). It derives its origin from the age-old agrarian culture of the land. Basically, it is an annual occasion wherein the farmer families celebrate their annual harvest of paddy. It has given rise to a great tradition of celebration by other communities, too. People of Western Odisha, irrespective of their economic occupation feast, song and dance, and rejoice in giving away on this day.

Observance

Year Wise Date and Day of Puspuni
2018 - 02 Jan 2018, Tuesday

Special deviation
Bargarh town, in Western Odisha deviates from the normal observation by delaying 1 day, as the mythical King of Dhanuyatra, death of Maharaj Kansa, on the same day as per Indian Lunar Calendar. The day is delayed due to death of the King Kansa on the largest open air theatre.

Feasting and merrymaking
The farmers of Western Odisha grow paddy on their agricultural land during monsoon and harvest in autumn. After they bring home all the yield, they find relaxed of all the toils and experience a great sense of satisfaction. This inspires them to rejoice with family and friends. On the full moon day of the month of Pausha they cook rice, tasty dishes (Chha' Tun Na' Bhajaa), especially goat meat, along with rice pudding and cakes. The family dines together and makes marry. They share their dishes and cakes with other families and friends. Some communities celebrate with Kusna (rice-liquor) and MahuliThis feasting is associated with community playing, singing and dancing. In past, the male youth played Chhur, Gudu, and Gourbaadi. Some engage themselves in pastimes like Kukraamaar (cock-fight), Garraamaar (ram-fight) and the like. Likewise, the girls played Saatgaati or Kansaadiindoors and Humo-bauli outdoors.

Chher-Chheraa
Apart from the great feasting and merrymaking, there is also one more great event that is observed on this Puspuni. This is known as Chher-Chheraa. The word is derived from two Sambalpuri words, Chere and Charaa. Chere-Charaa means "grains for the birds" – a small part of your produce for the unattended lives upon this earth!  
On this day the little boys and girls move round the village from door to door and collect Chher-Chheraa, a handful of grains from every household. With this they prepare food and feast away from home. Dance and music is an integral part of children's Chher-Chheraa. Chher Chheraa is also given away to the poor families who do not own agricultural land and or depend upon the farmers. Thus, Chher-Chheraa symbolises a concern for the non-producing members of the society.

Bhuti and Nistaar
On this day of Puspuni, the farmer gives away the remuneration to all labourers of all the agricultural operations. This remuneration is called Bhuti. So also, the farmer gives away some annual bonus to them. This bonus is called Nistaar. With this Nistaar the annual contract of labour ends for the previous agricultural year. As lexical meaning of the word nistaar is "freedom", for an agricultural labourer, Puspuni means the independence day and hence, celebration.

References

External links
 https://nawrangpur.blogspot.in/2017/01/chher-chhera-in-puspuni-at-nabarangpur.html
 http://www.bhubaneswarbuzz.com/updates/festivals/chher-chhera-puspuni-agricultural-festival-western-odisha
 http://jaikosal.blogspot.in/2011/01/puspuni-important-agricultural-festival.html
 http://eodishasamachar.com/en/western-odisha-community-of-uae-celebrates-puspuni-2017-invites-lokakabipadmashreehaladhar-nag-to-join-the-celebrations/
 https://odishalive.tv/news/puspuni-celebrations-organized-at-dubai/
 http://www.dailypioneer.com/state-editions/bhubaneswar/uae-w-odisha-community-to-organise-puspani.html

Festivals in Odisha